Sir Malcolm Green  is a retired British physician who was Vice-Principal of the Imperial College School of Medicine and Head of the National Heart and Lung Institute (NHLI).

Career

He studied medicine at Trinity College, Oxford and then St Thomas' Medical School before being appointed consultant physician in 1975 at St Bartholomew's Hospital and the Royal Brompton Hospital, a position he held for much (1975–2006) of his career.

Throughout his working life, his main interest was respiratory physiology and respiratory muscle function, both healthy and diseased. In 1985 he founded the British Lung Foundation, after which he was its chairman for 10 years and thereafter its President. He was Dean of the NHLI from 1988-1990. He also acted as Director of the British Postgraduate Medical Federation (1991–1996) and, for a time, Head of Research and Development for the National Health Service (NHS).

In 1997, he was appointed Vice-Principal for Postgraduate Medicine and Campus Dean at Imperial College School of Medicine.

He was awarded the British Thoracic Society medal for 2005. He was knighted for his services to medicine in the 2007 New Year Honours.

References

Alumni of Trinity College, Oxford
Alumni of St Thomas's Hospital Medical School
British pulmonologists
Fellows of the Royal College of Physicians
Knights Bachelor
Year of birth missing (living people)
Living people